The Philippines national basketball team was led by head coach Tab Baldwin in 2021.

The Philippines continued their campaign to qualify for the 2021 FIBA Asia Cup. The COVID-19 pandemic caused disruption to the hosting of the third window of the qualifiers which was originally scheduled to be held in February 2021. The Philippines was scheduled to host games but Qatar took over the hosting duties. The hosting duties was reverted back to the Philippines after Qatar begged off. The qualifiers was later postponed but was later successfully held in June 2021 with host Philippines managing to qualify for the tournament proper and sweeping all of their three games in the third window.

After initially failing to secure a berth in the FIBA World Olympic Qualifying Tournament (OQT) by virtue of FIBA rankings in September 2019, the Philippines was given a new chance to qualify for the 2020 Summer Olympics in Tokyo in February 2021. The team was given a berth in the OQT in Belgrade, Serbia after New Zealand's withdrawal. However the Philippines failed to qualify for the Olympics, losing games to Serbia and the Dominican Republic.

The team also participated at the 2021 King Abdullah Cup in Jordan as part of their preparations for the FIBA Asia Cup. However the FIBA Asia Cup was postponed by a year. Similarly the Philippines plans to field a basketball team at the 2021 Southeast Asian Games in Vietnam, but the multi-sporting event was likewise postponed to 2022.

Tournaments

FIBA Asia Cup qualification

2020 Olympic Qualifying Tournament

King Abdullah Cup

Preliminary round

Semifinal

Third place game

Exhibition games

Rosters

FIBA Asia Cup qualification
The following was the roster of the Philippines national team for the third window of the 2021 FIBA Asia Cup qualification.

2020 FIBA Men's Olympic Qualifying Tournament
The following was the roster of the Philippines national team for the 2020 FIBA Men's Olympic Qualifying Tournament in Belgrade.

References

Philippines men's national basketball team results
2020–21 in Philippine basketball
2021–22 in Philippine basketball